Spotless Group Holdings is an Australian listed company that provides Integrated facility services in Australian and New Zealand through a number of house brands. The company was formed in 1957, and currently employs more than 36,000 people, acquisitions have been an important driver of growth throughout its history.

Operations
Spotless operate a number of in-house brands, providing services in seven different areas to the industry groups;
 Laundry and linen
 Health, education and government
 Commercial and leisure
 Base and township

Laundries 
The laundry and linen branch operates in its own division, which provides 10% of revenue and is represented by the brands Ensign and Taylors.

Facilities services
The remaining six service areas, which report under the Facilities Services division, include:
 Asset management, operating the brands of Spotless, Nationwide Venue Management (NVM)
 Asset maintenance, under the brands, Assets Services, AE Smith, Nuvo
 Catering, under the brands, Epicure, Alliance, Mustard
 Cleaning, under the brands, Clean Domain, Clean Event
 Utilities services, under the brands, Utility Asset Service Group (UASG)
 Security, under the brand TechGuard Security (TGS)

History

1946 Ian McMullin founded Spotless as a dry cleaning business at 129 Smith Street, Fitzroy, Australia
1957 Business Incorporated as Spotless Pty Ltd
1961 Listed on the Australian Stock Exchange (ASX) as Spotless Limited
1968 Introduced a Kentucky Fried Chicken franchise from the United States
1970 Expand into New Zealand through Nationwide Food Services
1971 Acquired a local garment hanger supply business
1972 Ian McMullin (founder) retires, remains as director 
1977 Expanded into the industrial laundry space with the acquisition of a 50% interest in Ensign, the remaining 50% was acquired in 1981.
1977 Expanded into New Zealand market through laundry business acquisitions
1984 Diversified into food services with the acquisition of Nationwide Food Services and O’Brien. Catering (focused on stadia, residential, boarding schools and mine sites catering)
1987 First contract with the Australian Department of Defence. Acquired Plastiform (US based) to expand into the international garment hanger manufacturing and supply business
1991 Increased scale of the New Zealand laundries business with the acquisition of 55% of Taylors (New Zealand Stock Exchange listed laundry services business); the remaining 45% was acquired in 2009
1993 Enhanced catering offering with the acquisition of Mustard Catering, a large Western Australia based up-market catering group
1999 Strengthened facility maintenance and cleaning capabilities with the acquisition of Support Services businesses from P&O in Australia and New Zealand
2001 Acquired Braitrim (UK based), which was merged with Plastiform to form Braiform to further expand garment hanger manufacturing and supply capability.
2001 Acquired Epicure Catering providing exposure to high end, boutique catering services and further extending capabilities across catering services
2004 Won its first PPP project for social infrastructure to provide facilities services for New South Wales schools
2006–2008 Acquisition of Alliance Catering. Ian McMullin (founder), Ron Evans and Brian Blythe stepped down from Board 2006–08. Change of management
2009 Expanded facility management capability by extending service maintenance product lines into painting with the acquisition of Riley Shelley (a painting and refurbishment business)
2010 Obtained secondary listing on New Zealand Stock Exchange.
2010 Entered into the international facility services market with the acquisition of CE Property Services – Cleanevent and CleanDomain
2012 Taken private by Pacific Industrial Services — an entity owned by the PEP Shareholders, the Coinvestment Shareholders and Management Shareholders.
2012 Appointment of Bruce Dixon as CEO leading a new management team, he restructured the company around industry segments (rather than service sectors) to promote Spotless as an "integrated services provider", he also took steps to empower employees by promoted open communication and pushing decision making and responsibility down into the business. 
2012 Divested non-core divisions Braiform and International Services
2014 Relisted on the ASX under the code SPO
2014 Acquires contracts, assets and liabilities of the national security company ACG, launches it under the new brand Techguard Security (TGS)
2015 Acquires AE Smith, a commercial air-conditioning and mechanical services contractor
2015 Acquires Utility Services Group (USG), a provider of meter reading and installation services, rebranded as  Utility Asset Services Group (UASG)
2015 Acquires Prime Laundries to increase Laundry processing volumes.
2016 Acquires Nuvo, an electrical and Technology services company.
2017 Downer Group launched a hostile takeover bid gaining control in June 2017
2015/16 Spotless took over ACG, a security company and renamed it Techguard.

Partnerships
On 2 September 2013, the local organising committee of the 2015 Cricket World Cup, which was hosted by New Zealand and Australia, appointed a joint venture of Nine Live and Spotless Group to provide hospitality services for the tournament. The services include sales, marketing and event management of the tournament’s hospitality program.

Industrial relations

Controversies
Spotless has become the focus of a high-profile industrial relations test case in Australia after claims of bullying and harassment surrounding Spotless’ use of individual flexible agreements (IFAs), were raised by members of United Voice. United Voice is the union that represents contract cleaners employed by Spotless at shopping centres, CBD buildings and other privately and publicly owned buildings.
 
The case will be heard by the Federal Court of Australia, where United Voice will argue that Spotless is in breach of the Fair Work Act as it leaves cleaners worse off than they would be without the IFAs.
 
United Voice will also tell Fair Work Australia and the Federal Court that cleaners have reported that they have been unduly pressured into signing the agreements and were allegedly told if they refuse to sign the IFAs they were warned that their hours would be cut or that they would be refused overtime hours which they have enjoyed under the Cleaning Services Award. 
 
United Voice will also claim Spotless misrepresented the IFAs to its workers. The Union says Spotless' use of IFAs in these circumstances is contrary to the spirit and intent of the Individual Flexibility provisions under the Fair Work Act and that Spotless are trying to re-introduce WorkChoices AWAs by the back door.

The case was due to go to before Fair Work Australia on 18 April 2011, however, Spotless did not attend the voluntary mediation.

Fair work resolution
In April 2012, Spotless agreed to audit a representative group of cleaners’ employment records to ensure they were paid properly and receiving their full entitlements.

The Fair Work Ombudsman welcomed Spotless’ decision to sign a Pro-Active Compliance Deed and congratulated them on their demonstration of corporate responsibility. Spotless will provide a report on the findings from their audit to the Fair Work Ombudsman. Spotless and United Voice now have a professional relationship based on a much better understanding of each other's respective positions.

See also
2007 Spotless dispute
 List of cleaning companies

References

External links

Pro-Active Compliance Deed

Cleaning companies
Companies formerly listed on the Australian Securities Exchange
Service companies of Australia